Roberto "Bobby" Ríos Osorio (born August 14, 1957) is a retired Puerto Rican basketball player. Ríos played as a point guard and shooting guard for five different teams during his career, and won three championships. He is currently 5th in assists and 7th in scoring of all-time in the league.

Career

Ríos was born in Santurce, Puerto Rico on August 14, 1957. He debuted with the Vaqueros de Bayamón in 1978.

In 1981, Ríos was traded to the Leones de Ponce where he became the starting point guard. He ended up averaging 17.7 points per game in his first season and remained a consistent scorer during this first stint with the team. However, in the middle of the 1985 season, Ríos was traded to the Atléticos de San Germán. He averaged 15 points per game during 23 games with San Germán, and won his first championship. During the next five seasons with the team, Ríos averaged over 20 points per game in every season.

In 1991, Ríos returned to Ponce and remained with them for 8 seasons. During those seasons, he continued to be a prolific scorer, winning 2 more championships and the Most Valuable Player award in 1995. Ríos was the first player in the history of the BSN to reach the platform of 1,000 3 point baskets made and was arguably one of the best 3 point shooters of all-times in the league. In 1999 Ríos went to the Brujos de Guayama and played with them for two seasons. He retired in 2001 as a member of the Maratonistas de Coamo.

Personal life 
Roberto "Bobby" Ríos at an early age had excelled in a variety of sports before playing basketball including track and field where he was a prospect at Central High School in Santurce, Puerto Rico. He started his semi-pro basketball career in 1977 with the San Juan Moderno team that at the time was head coached by the legendary Julio Toro. That led him to be invited by the Vaqueros de Bayamón's then star Rubén Montañez to the team practices and eventually Ríos was signed by then Bayamón owner Hetin Reyes in 1978. 

Ríos moved to Ponce, Puerto Rico in 1981, after he was traded to the Leonés De Ponce. He also has three daughters that are his # 1 fans. Ríos worked for the city of Ponce for 20 years and is currently retired and enjoying his life. He also lives very grateful to the sport of basketball.

Statistics

|-
| align="left" | 1978
| align="left" | Bayamón
| 32 || .527 || .000 || .776 || 1.5 || 0.8 || 9.3
|-
| align="left" | 1979
| align="left" | Bayamón
| 30 || .512 || .000 || .800 || 2.1 || 1.9 || 8.6
|-
| align="left" | 1980
| align="left" | Ponce
| 28 || .446 || .000 || .822 || 3.0 || 2.3 || 8.6
|-
| align="left" | 1981
| align="left" | Ponce
| 33 || .504 || .222 || .796 || 3.2 || 5.3 || 17.8
|-
| align="left" | 1982
| align="left" | Ponce
| 32 || .469 || .167 || .694 || 3.2 || 3.3 || 16.8
|-
| align="left" | 1983
| align="left" | Ponce
| 33 || .470 || .381 || .810 || 2.8 || 3.5 || 13.5
|-
| align="left" | 1984
| align="left" | Ponce
| 24 || .454 || .418 || .852 || 3.6 || 3.3 || 15.5
|-
| align="left" | 1985
| align="left" | Ponce
| 9 || .467 || .538 || .839 || 2.6 || 1.8 || 13.0
|-
|style="text-align:left;background:#afe6ba;"| 1985
| align="left" | San Germán
| 23 || .500 || .382 || .825 || 3.0 || 3.6 || 15.1
|-
| align="left" | 1986
| align="left" | San Germán
| 33 || .475 || .448 || .819 || 2.4 || 5.8 || 22.3
|-
| align="left" | 1987
| align="left" | San Germán
| 30 || .509 || .412 || .898 || 2.1 || 5.1 || 24.7
|-
| align="left" | 1988
| align="left" | San Germán
| 31 || .459 || .364 || .808 || 2.8 || 6.4 || 20.1
|-
| align="left" | 1989
| align="left" | San Germán
| 30 || .488 || .435 || .894 || 3.2 || 6.2 || 21.7
|-
| align="left" | 1990
| align="left" | San Germán
| 30 || .460 || .374 || .855 || 3.5 || 4.4 || 21.2
|-
| align="left" | 1991
| align="left" | Ponce
| 22 || .523 || .469 || .781 || 2.5 || 3.0 || 16.5
|-
|style="text-align:left;background:#afe6ba;"| 1992
| align="left" | Ponce
| 33 || .485 || .422 || .871 || 3.6 || 7.1 || 19.0
|-
|style="text-align:left;background:#afe6ba;"| 1993
| align="left" | Ponce
| 34 || .457 || .396 || .891 || 2.8 || 5.3 || 17.1
|-
| align="left" | 1994
| align="left" | Ponce
| 30 || .490 || .413 || .864 || 2.0 || 2.2 || 20.4
|-
| align="left" | 1995
| align="left" | Ponce
| 32 || .443 || .376 || .864 || 2.9 || 4.3 || 20.8
|-
| align="left" | 1996
| align="left" | Ponce
| 34 || .442 || .401 || .752 || 2.6 || 2.5 || 20.3
|-
| align="left" | 1997
| align="left" | Ponce
| 28 || .465 || .485 || .883 || 1.2 || 2.2 || 15.3
|-
| align="left" | 1998
| align="left" | Ponce
| 30 || .455 || .414 || .814 || 1.4 || 2.6 || 16.1
|-
| align="left" | 1999
| align="left" | Guayama
| 21 || .467 || .424 || .886 || 1.1 || 1.0 || 11.3
|-
| align="left" | 2000
| align="left" | Guayama
| 19 || .217 || .136 || .929 || 0.8 || 0.4 || 1.9
|-
| align="left" | Career
| align="left" |
| 681 || .466 || .337 || .834 || 2.5 || 3.3 || 16.1

References

External links
Bobby Ríos Profile on BSNPR.com

1957 births
Living people
Atléticos de San Germán players
Baloncesto Superior Nacional players
Leones de Ponce basketball players
Point guards
Puerto Rican men's basketball players